The Toaroha River is a river of the West Coast Region of New Zealand's South Island. It flows generally north through a valley between the Toaroha and Diedrichs Ranges to reach the Kokatahi River 25 kilometres southeast of Hokitika.

See also
List of rivers of New Zealand

References

Rivers of the West Coast, New Zealand
Rivers of New Zealand
Westland District